The Zona Volcànica de la Garrotxa Natural Park is a natural park area covering a Holocene volcanic field (also known as the Olot volcanic field) in Catalonia, northeastern Spain. The volcanos, of which there are about forty within the park, are no longer active, with the last eruption (Croscat) occurring about 11,000 years ago. However, the region is still seismically active, and a large earthquake in 1428 caused damage to buildings and twenty deaths in Barcelona,  to the south. More recent earthquakes in 1901 and 1902 caused shaking but little damage.

The park covers 12,093.02 hectares, and includes territory from eleven municipalities in the comarca of Garrotxa. The built-up areas of Olot, Santa Pau, Sant Joan les Fonts and Castellfollit de la Roca are completely surrounded by the park. Including these urban areas, the population of the park is more than 40,000 people, and the economic development of the zone is one of the objectives of the park management, while trying to avoid the damage caused by quarrying, urban sprawl and illegal waste disposal. Some 980.86 ha of the park, including the best preserved volcanic cones, are fully protected as nature reserves.

Geology
The Garrotxa field is a monogenetic volcanic field, with each volcano representing a single period of eruption. The field became active about 700,000 years ago, and is the most recent expression of volcanic activity in northeastern Catalonia, which dates back 10 million years.

See also
 List of volcanoes in Spain

References

Bibliography
.
. pp. 1–59; pp. 60–106.
.

External links 
Official site
Garrotxa Volcanic Zone Natural Park
Fageda de'n Jordá

Volcanic fields
Volcanoes of Catalonia
Garrotxa
Natural parks of Catalonia
Protected areas established in 1982
Holocene volcanoes
Inactive volcanoes
1982 establishments in Spain